John Patrick (born 22 September 1955) is a Grenadian cricketer. He played in one first-class and one List A match for the Windward Islands in 1977/78.

See also
 List of Windward Islands first-class cricketers

References

External links
 

1955 births
Living people
Grenadian cricketers
Windward Islands cricketers